Jurinia is a genus of flies in the family Tachinidae.

Species
J. gagatea Robineau-Desvoidy, 1830
J. pompalis (Reinhard, 1941)
J. smithi (van der Wulp, 1890)

References

Tachininae
Tachinidae genera
Taxa named by Jean-Baptiste Robineau-Desvoidy